Alexander Kolb (12 May 1891 – 4 April 1963) was a German Generalleutnant during World War II.

Biography

Kolb was born in Mainz. He entered Army Service as Fahnenjunker and Company-Officer in the 3rd Foot-Artillery-Regiment in 1914. After Adjutant of the General Of Flak Artillery of Fortress of Mainz he became Battery-Leader in the 3rd Foot-Artillery-Regiment (1914/15) and 18th Reserve-Foot-Artillery-Regiment (1915/18). 1918 he was a commander of the 32nd Foot-Artillery-Battalion. After the First World War he works for the Hessian Protection-Police and State-Police-Department Worms.

In 1935 he became Battalion-Commander in the 10th Flak-Regiment and 1936 Battalion-Commander in the 25th Flak-Regiment. After use as Commander of the 13th Flak-Regiment (1937/38) and Higher Commander of Flak Artillery III (1938) he was Commander of Air-Defence-Command 2, Stettin and Delegate with the Formation of Air-Defence-Command. At 1 January 1939 he was appointed Generalmajor and 1 November 1940 Generalleutnant.

1939/40 he was Commander of Air-Defence-Command 6, Hannover, and 1940 Commander of Flak-Artillery in Air-Region XI. 1940/41 he got the Command of Air-Defence-Command 8. From 1 Jul 1941 to 31 May 1943 Alexander Kolb was Officer with Special Duties of the Ministry of Aviation (Germany) (RLM) and Commander-in-Chief of the Luftwaffe. He retired in 1943.

Awards and decorations
 Iron Cross of 1914, 1st and 2nd class
 Clasp to the Iron Cross of 1939, 1st and 2nd class

References

External links
 CV Alexander Kolb

1891 births
1963 deaths
Military personnel from Mainz
Lieutenant generals of the Luftwaffe
Recipients of the clasp to the Iron Cross, 1st class
People from Rhenish Hesse
Luftwaffe World War II generals